Sonny Jack Carey (born 20 January 2001) is an English professional footballer who plays for Blackpool, as a midfielder. He has previously played for King's Lynn Town.

Career
Born in Norwich, Carey spent his early career with Norwich City where he was in the Academy between 2010 and 2017. Following on from his release from Norwich he had trials at Cambridge United and Oxford United and also represented England Colleges FA team during the 2018–19 season. He had a spell at Norwich United before he joined Wroxham in the Eastern Counties Football League before being invited to join King's Lynn Town. He signed for Blackpool in June 2021.

He scored his first goal in the Football League in Blackpool's 3–1 victory over Peterborough United on 18 December 2021.

Career statistics

References

2001 births
Living people
English footballers
Norwich City F.C. players
Wroxham F.C. players
King's Lynn Town F.C. players
Blackpool F.C. players
Association football midfielders
National League (English football) players
English Football League players
Norwich United F.C. players